Azerithonica is a genus of Asian funnel weavers containing the single species, Azerithonica hyrcanica. It was first described by E. Guseinov, Yuri M. Marusik & S. Koponen in 2005, and has only been found in Azerbaijan.

References

External links

Agelenidae
Monotypic Araneomorphae genera
Spiders of Asia